Quirke is a crime drama television series that was first broadcast on BBC One and RTÉ One in 2014. The three-part series is based on the Quirke novels by John Banville, writing under the pseudonym Benjamin Black, and was adapted by Andrew Davies and Conor McPherson.

Regular cast
Gabriel Byrne as Quirke
Nick Dunning as Malachi Griffin
Aisling Franciosi as Phoebe Griffin
Michael Gambon as Judge Garret Griffin
Geraldine Somerville as Sarah Griffin
Stanley Townsend as Inspector Hackett
Brian Gleeson as Sinclair

Complete main cast

Production
Quirke was commissioned by Danny Cohen and Ben Stephenson. The executive producers are Jessica Pope for the BBC, Ed Guiney for Element Pictures and Joan Egan for Tyrone Productions and Lisa Osborne as producer. A £389,388 production loan from the Irish Film Board was provided for the series. The series was filmed in Dublin, from 19 November 2012 to 8 March 2013. Filming locations include Baggot Street, Camden Street and the main set at Clancy Barracks.

RTÉ One began broadcasting the series before BBC One, debuting on 16 February 2014. The series has been sold to five broadcasters and will air in Germany (Degeto), Croatia (HRT), Denmark (Danmarks Radio), Iceland (RÚV) and Slovenia (RTV). The series was also broadcast on BBC UKTV in New Zealand in March 2014 and on NERIT in Greece in January 2015.  The series began broadcasting in the US (PBS) on 3 April 2015, and on Knowledge Network in Canada in August 2015.

Episode list

Home media
The DVD edition of Quirke was released in the UK on 9 June 2014.

References

External links
 
 
 Quirke at Raidió Teilifís Éireann

British crime television series
BBC television dramas
2014 British television series debuts
2014 British television series endings
2010s British drama television series
Irish crime television series
Irish drama television series
2014 Irish television series debuts
2014 Irish television series endings
Television shows set in the Republic of Ireland
English-language television shows